Nataša Zorić (born 27 November 1989) is a Serbian former tennis player. Zorić has reached one WTA Tour final in doubles, at the 2008 Gastein Ladies with Sesil Karatantcheva, where they lost to Andrea Hlaváčková and Lucie Hradecká in straight sets. Her career-high rankings are 388 in singles and No. 218 in doubles, both set on 6 October 2008. Zorić won four ITF singles titles, and 12 ITF doubles titles in her career.

After solving injury problems, Zorić won the singles title at the ITF Budapest on 14 June 2009.

WTA career finals

Doubles: 1 (runner-up)

ITF Circuit finals

Singles: 8 (4–4)

Doubles: 19 (12–7)

References

External links
 
 
 

1989 births
Living people
Sportspeople from Osijek
Serbian female tennis players
Serbia and Montenegro female tennis players
Serbs of Croatia